Corynandra elegans, the elegant spider-flower, is a species of flowering plants in the family Cleomaceae. It is found in the Konkan region of Maharashtra, India.

References

External links 

 Corynandra elegans at flowersofindia.net

Plants described in 2016
Cleomaceae
Flora of Maharashtra
Konkan